The gubguba, also known as gabgubagub, guba, gopijantro, gubgubbi, ananda lahari, premtal, khamak, khomok, chonka, jamidika, jamuku and bapang is an Indian percussion string instrument. 

It consists of a dried gourd or wooden resonator through which a gut string is attached. The player holds the body of the instrument under the arm and the free end of the string in the fist of the same arm. The string is plucked with a plectrum in the other hand. Some varieties of the gubgubbi, particularly the Bengali khomok or khamak, contain two strings.

References
 Dutta, Madhumita. (2008). Music & Musical Instruments of India. . 
 Simon Leng, While My Guitar Gently Weeps: The Music of George Harrison, Hal Leonard (Milwaukee, WI, 2006), p. 158.vycycyv

External links
 https://www.youtube.com/watch?v=Zy2RV_DZeDs Performance featuring a khamak

Indian musical instruments
Stringed percussion instruments
Hand percussion
Percussion instruments played with specialised beaters
Asian percussion instruments
Unpitched percussion instruments
String instruments
Plucked membranophones